Yukpa is an Amerindian ethnic group that inhabits the northeastern part of the Cesar Department in northern Colombia by the Serranía del Perijá bordering Venezuela. Their territory covers the eastern areas of the municipalities of Robles La Paz, Codazzi and Becerril in Resguardos (indian reserve) named Socorpa, Menkue, El Cozo Iroka and some other small areas in Venezuela.  According to an Inter Press Service story, the majority of the Yukpa, who number nearly 10,000, live in Venezuela although some communities are still located in the mountains across the border in Colombia. The Yukpa people have been known to consume certain nest-inhabiting wasp species, such as Polistes pacificus, which make paper nests that can be quickly knocked from its hanging place on a tree directly into a fire, where the larvae are then toasted.

See also
Yukpa language

Notes

External links
 Ethnologue.com: the Yukpa language
 everyculture.com: Yukpa
 Red de Gestores Sociales: Yukpa
 ESTUDIO SOBRE LAS CONDICIONES Y CALIDAD DE VIDA DE LA ETNIA YUKPA
 ESTUDIO SOBRE LAS CONDICIONES Y CALIDAD DE VIDA DE LA ETNIA YUKPA Scribd 
 David M. Howard account of protestant missionaries among Yukpa Indians
 "Venezuela Returns More Land to Yukpa People in 2011," Indian Country Today
 "Taking the Gospel to the Yukpa" The Wall Street Journal

Circum-Caribbean tribes
Indigenous peoples in Colombia
Indigenous peoples in Venezuela